Müllheim (High Alemannic: Mille) is a town in Baden-Württemberg in southern Germany. It belongs to the district Breisgau-Hochschwarzwald. Müllheim is generally considered to be the center of the region known as Markgräflerland.

History
On October 27, 758 Strachfried gave as a gift to the monastery of St. Gallen his properties in Müllheim, including the vineyards. This deed is in the archives of St. Gallen and it is where we today can find the first written reference to the "villa Mulinhaimo", which is the current city of Müllheim.

Archeology shows however that Müllheim was inhabited even earlier than this. During the renovation of the Martin's church in 1980 and 1981 the workers came upon a portion of a Roman villa. It is assumed that it is the center of large Roman possessions in the region.

Population
Inhabitants: 17,630 (February 2002) as follows -
12,030 Central Müllheim
1351 Hügelheim;
1235 Niederweiler;
991 Britzingen;
812 Vögisheim;
636 Feldberg;
362 Dattingen;
215 Zunzingen.

Geography
Müllheim is located in the center of Markgräflerland, in between the "Bath triangle" of Badenweiler, Bad Krozingen and Bad Bellingen. The city lies between the Rhine valley and the Black Forest with hills devoted largely to vineyards.

Müllheim is bordered by Auggen (to the south), Vögisheim to the southeast, and Hügelheim to the north. The main artery is the B3 which runs a north-south route along Müllheim's western side. It lies between Freiburg in the north and Basel, Switzerland to the south on this route.

Economy
Local jobs roughly. 8,000 of which about 3,000 are industrial, mainly work with glass, and metal.

Commuting:
Incoming: about 4,000
Outgoing: about 3,000

Education

General schools
Michael-Friedrich-Wild-Grundschule
Rosenburg Grundschule
Grundschule Britzingen
Adolf-Blankenhorn-Hauptschule
Albert-Julius-Sievert-Förder- u. Sprachheilschule Heilpädagogisches Förderzentrum
Alemannen-Realschule
Markgräfler Gymnasium
Freie Waldorfschule

Professional schools
Georg-Kerschensteiner-Schule Gewerbliche Schulen
House (Home economics) and agricultural Schools
Commercial Schools

Miscellaneous schools
Forum Jugend-Beruf
Grundschulförderklasse
Sprachheilkindergarten

Transport
Müllheim (Baden) station is on the Rhine Valley Railway, which is serviced by Deutsche Bahn.

From Müllheim schedule 
To Müllheim schedule

International relations

Twin towns and cities
Müllheim is twinned with:
 Gray, France
 Vevey, Switzerland

People

 Ernst Krieck (1882-1947), teacher, writer and professor, influential on pedagogy in national socialism
 Joscha Kiefer (born 1982), actor

References

External links

Official Web site 
History and many images 

Breisgau-Hochschwarzwald
Baden